Philippe Morenvillier (born December 6, 1965 in Nancy) is a French politician, former member of the National Assembly of France.  He represented the Meurthe-et-Moselle department, as a member of the Union for a Popular Movement.

Biography 
He joined the party Debout la France in April 2019, explaining his departure from les Republicans by the refusal of Nadine Morano to support him during the general elections and believing that the party became "a drunken boat, left by the figureheads". After a short period as National Delegate to Small and Medium Enterprises, he resigned and decided to support Marine le Pen and joined the circle of the National Rally.

References

1965 births
Living people
Politicians from Nancy, France
Union for a Popular Movement politicians
Deputies of the 13th National Assembly of the French Fifth Republic
Debout la France politicians